Cryptanthus crassifolius is a plant species in the genus Cryptanthus. This species is endemic to Brazil.

References

crassifolius
Flora of Brazil
Plants described in 2008